Álvaro Pires Pinheiro Lobo (c.1460-1511) was a Portuguese nobleman, who served as Alcaide-mór of Barcelos. He had served as a vassal of Fernando I, Duke of Braganza.

Biography 
Álvaro was born in Portugal, son of Pedro Esteves and Isabel Pinheiro. His father had been an important member of the court of Braganza, and an descendant of Rodrigo Anes de Penela, Lord of Penela.

He was married to  Joana Lacerda, a noble Lady who served to Isabella of Portugal. She was daughter of Nuno Pereira de Lacerda (descendant of Fernando de Lacerda) and Guiomar de Brito.

Álvaro Pires Pinheiro Lobo served as Administrator of Morgado de Pouve, and Nobleman of the house of the Duke of Braganza, Dom Fernando I.

References

External links 
Nobiliário de familias de Portugal (ORIGEM DOS PINHEIROS)
Reflexões sobre a origem dos Pinheiro, de Barcelos

Portuguese nobility
15th-century Portuguese people
People from Barcelos, Portugal
1460 deaths
Year of birth uncertain